is a karate kata with uncertain origin. It may have originated from either the Tomari-te style or the Naha-te style and is also known as Yantsu. It is a bunkai form practiced mainly in the Shito-ryu and Kyokushin schools.

References 

Karate kata
Shitō-ryū